The 71st Massachusetts General Court, consisting of the Massachusetts Senate and the Massachusetts House of Representatives, met in 1850 during the governorship of George N. Briggs. Marshall Pinckney Wilder served as president of the Senate and Ensign H. Kellogg served as speaker of the House.

Senators

Representatives

 James A. Abbott

See also
 31st United States Congress
 List of Massachusetts General Courts

References

External links
 
 

Political history of Massachusetts
Massachusetts legislative sessions
massachusetts
1850 in Massachusetts